The Joint Special Forces Operations Headquarters (COFS) is the joint command of the Italian Armed Forces charged with overseeing the various special operations units of the Italian Armed Forces. The command is part of the Joint Operations Command and is validated as NATO Component Command. COFS is headquartered at Centocelle Airport in Rome, Italy.

Mission 
At the national level, COFS is the Command specifically designated in charge of planning, organizing and conducting Special Operations, which include special reconnaissance, direct actions and military assistance.

COFS commander is also an advisor to the Chief of Defense for all aspects concerning Special Operations. He also assists the political-military leaders in operational decisions, deals with the procurement of materials to be adopted by the special operations forces, on the basis of specific needs expressed by the units themselves.

History 
The Joint Forces Command for Operations of the Special Forces was established on 1 December 2004 under the direct control of the Chief of the Defence Staff.

COFS, initially, had the objective of coordinating the missions of the two defense special forces departments: the 9th Paratroopers Assault Regiment "Col Moschin", and GOI of the COMSUBIN. In 2005 the GIS and the 17th Raiders Wingwere made available to COFS for possible use.

In 2006 the new command launched Operation "Sarissa", which involved the deployment and use of Task Force 45 in Afghanistan.

In 2008, after a validation process, the Command was certified by NATO as a Component Command for Special Operations within the framework of the NATO Response Force.

In 2021, COFS was moved under the renewed Joint Operations Command.

List of commanders 
As of 2022, COFS has had seven commanders.

Organization 
The Joint Operational Command of the Special Forces is an Operational Command that has a hierarchical structure consisting of the Commander (COMCOFS), the Deputy Commander (DCOMCOFS) and the Chief of Staff (COS). COFS represents the staff body available to the Joint Forces Operations Command on the subject of special operations and reports directly to the latter's Commander.

Subordinate units 
The command is responsible for the operations conducted by Tier-1 special forces units:
  9th Paratroopers Assault Regiment "Col Moschin" of the Italian Army;
  4th Alpini Paratroopers Regiment "Monte Cervino" of the Italian Army;
  185th Paratroopers Reconnaissance Target Acquisition Regiment "Folgore" of the Italian Army;
  COMSUBIN of the Italian Navy;
 17th Raiders Wing of the Italian Air Force;
  GIS of the Carabinieri (for military needs).

See also 
 Italian special forces
 Army Special Forces Command (Italy)

References 

Military units and formations established in 2004
Special forces of Italy